Dietzia is a Gram-positive bacterial genus from the family Dietziaceae which occur in many different habitats including humans and animals. The species Dietzia maris is a human pathogen. The genus Dietzia is named after the American microbiologist Alma Dietz.

References

Further reading 
 
 
 

Mycobacteriales
Bacteria genera